Camping Life is a Chinese reality show broadcast by iQIYI and Jiangsu Television. Season 1 was broadcast from 28 April 2022 till 30 June 2022. Season 2 is slated to premiere in April 2023.

Cast

Season 1

Camping Family
 William Chan (episodes 1–10)
 Yang Di (episodes 1–10)
 Huang Yali (episodes 1–10)
 Wang Ziyi (episodes 1–10)
 Zhang Ruonan (episodes 1–4, 9–10)
 Zhong Chuxi (episodes 5–10)

Camping Guests
Zhu Yunfeng (episodes 1–2)
Wang Yuan (episodes 3–4)  
Tang Jiuzhou (episodes 7–8)
Jeffrey Tung (episodes 9–10)
Zhu Zhengting (episodes 9–10)

Season 2

Camping Family
 William Chan (episodes 1-)
 Yang Di (episodes 1-)
 Wei Daxun (episodes 1-)
 Yin Zheng (episodes 1-)
 Zhang Yanqi (episodes 1-)

Camping Guests
Song Yuqi (episodes 1–2)
Zhou Jieqiong (episodes 1–2)
Hu Lan (episodes 3–4)
Xu Zhisheng (episodes 3–4)

References

External links 
 Camping Life on Weibo
 Camping Life on Douban

IQIYI original programming
Chinese reality television series
2022 Chinese television series debuts
2022 Chinese television series endings